The Philippine School Sultanate of Oman (also known as Philippine School Muscat), established in 1989, is a private school in the Persian Gulf region. Located in the city of Muscat, Oman, the school caters to the Filipino community as well as foreigners.

See also
Filipinos in Oman

References

1989 establishments in Oman
Educational institutions established in 1989
International schools in Oman
Schools in Muscat, Oman
Private schools in Oman